Carlos Labbé is a Chilean fiction writer who lives in Brooklyn, New York, USA.

Biography 
He graduated in Latin American and Spanish Literature; his dissertation was about Juan Carlos Onetti. Later he obtained a master's degree in Latin American and Spanish Literature with a dissertation on Roberto Bolaño. He has published a hypertext novel, Pentagonal: incluidos tú y yo (2001) and the novels Libro de plumas (2004), Navidad y Matanza (2007), Locuela (2009), Piezas secretas contra el mundo (2014), La parvá (2015), Coreografías espirituales (2018) y Viaje a Partagua (2021). His other works include two short story collections, Caracteres blancos (2010) and Cortas las pesadillas con alebrijes (2016), the literary essay book Por una pluralidad literaria chilena: el grupo Juan Emar (2019), the pop music records Doce canciones para Eleodora (2007), Monicacofonía (2008), Mi nuevo órgano (2011) and Ofri Afro (2018), and the ambient music collection Repeticiones para romper el cerco (2013). He co-wrote the screenplays for the films Malta con huevo (2007) and El nombre (2015). In the past he was a member of the bands Ex Fiesta and Tornasólidos.

Since 2010 Labbé has split residence between New York and Chile.

Works 
Novels
Pentagonal, incluidos tú y yo (hypertext novel, 2001)
Libro de plumas (2004)
Navidad y Matanza (2007, German translation in 2010 by Peter Tremp, English translation in 2014 by Will Vanderhyden)
Locuela (2009, English translation in 2015 by Will Vanderhyden, Turkish translation in 2017 by Saliha Nilüfer)
Piezas secretas contra el mundo (2014)
La parvá (2015)
Coreografías espirituales (2017) English translation in 2019 by Will Vanderhyden)
Viaje a Partagua (2021)

Short Stories

Caracteres blancos (2010)
Short the Seven Nightmares with Alebrijes (2015, English translation by Ruy Burgos-Lovece)
Cortas las pesadillas con alebrijes (2016)

Book-Length Essays

Por una pluralidad literaria chilena. El colectivo Juan Emar (1923-hoy) (2019)

Music Records

Doce canciones para Eleodora (2007)
Monicacofonía (2008)
Mi nuevo órgano (2011)
Repeticiones para romper el cerco (2013)
Ofri Afro (2018)

Awards, Grants, and Recognition 
Writers Fund, Chilean National Council for the Books and Reading, 2003.
Pedro Sienna Award of the Chilean National Council for the Arts and Culture, Best Feature Film Screenwriting for Malta con huevo (Scrambled Beer, in the English edition), co-written with Cristóbal Valderrama, 2008.
Granta magazine's Best Young Spanish Language Novelists, 2010.
Bronx Council of the Arts, BRIO Literature Awards, Contest Panelist, 2017.
The Neustadt International Prize for Literature 2022, Juror.

References 
Pedro Sienna 2008 Award to Best Chilean.
Granta Magazine 113: The Best of Young Spanish-Language Novelists
Doce canciones para Eleodora, Carlos Labbé's first solo album
Pentagonal, incluidos tú y yo, hypertext novel.
Malta con huevo / Scrambled Beer. Feature film, screenplay co-written by Carlos Labbé.

External links 
 Carlos Labbé's Fiction Writing in Granta 113 Magazine, in English.
 English writer Toby Litt on Carlos Labbé's work.
 Collected criticism on Carlos Labbé's work, in Spanish.
 Editorial Periférica, Carlos Labbé's publisher in Spain.
 Sangría Editora, Carlos Labbé's publisher in Chile.
 Lateinamerika Verlag, publisher of Carlos Labbé's Navidad und Matanza in German Language.
 The complete Carlos Labbé's solo music albums, in English.
 Some songs from Tornasólidos rock band, in Spanish.
 Some songs from Ex Fiesta pop band, in Spanish.
 Some songs from Carlos Labbé's solo music albums, in Spanish.
 Sobrelibros.cl, online literary magazine in Spanish, publishes Carlos Labbé's reviews on Latin American books.
 Open Letter Books, publisher of Carlos Labbé's Navidad & Matanza in English.
 Open Letter Books, publisher of Carlos Labbé's Loquela in English.
 Malta con huevo feature film, co-written screenplay by Carlos Labbé 
 El nombre feature film, co-written screenplay by Carlos Labbé

1977 births
21st-century Chilean male writers
21st-century Chilean novelists
Chilean male novelists
Chilean literary critics
People from Santiago
Living people
Chilean expatriates in the United States